Kurt Vonnegut was an American author

Vonnegut may also refer to:

Vonnegut (surname), various persons of that name
25399 Vonnegut, an asteroid named after author Kurt Vonnegut
Vonnegut Hardware Company